Australia competed at the 2022 Winter Olympics in Beijing, China, from 4 to 20 February 2022.

The Australian team consisted of 43 athletes (21 men and 22 women), competing in 10 sports. This marked a decrease of seven athletes from 2018. Alpine skier Madison Hoffman was selected but withdrew due to an ACL injury. Brendan Kerry and Laura Peel were the country's flagbearers during the opening ceremony. Freestyle skier Sami Kennedy-Sim was the closing ceremony flagbearer.

The use of Simplified Chinese stroke count placed it antepenultimate in the Parade of Nations before the host nation of the next Winter Olympics (Italy) and the host nation (China) as it takes sixteen (16) strokes to write the first character of its Chinese name, more than any other participating country.

On 12 February, Jaclyn Narracott's silver medal in women's skeleton gave Australia its fourth medal at the games, breaking the nation's record for total medals won at a single Winter Olympics.

Medallists

The following Australian competitors won medals at the games. In the by discipline sections below, medallists names are bolded.

Competitors
The following is the list of number of competitors who participated at the Games per sport/discipline.

Alpine skiing

Australia qualified one male and two female alpine skiers.

Bobsleigh

Cross-country skiing

Australia qualified three male and two female cross-country skiers, and added one more male quota during reallocation.

Due to high winds and adverse weather conditions, the men's 50 km freestyle competition on 19 February was shortened to 30 km.

Distance
Men

Women

Sprint
Men

Women

Curling

Australia's curling team consisted of two athletes (one per gender), competing in the mixed doubles tournament. This marked the country's debut in the sport at the Olympics. The team won two out of nine matches and did not advance to the medal round.

Summary

Mixed doubles tournament

Australia qualified their mixed doubles team (two athletes), by finishing in the top two teams in the 2021 Olympic Qualification Event.

Round robin
Australia had a bye in draws 3, 9, 10 and 13.

Draw 1
Wednesday, 2 February, 20:05

Draw 2
Thursday, 3 February, 9:05

Draw 4
Thursday, 3 February, 20:05

Draw 5
Friday, 4 February, 8:35

Draw 6
Friday, 4 February, 13:35

Draw 7
Saturday, 5 February, 9:05

Draw 8
Saturday, 5 February, 14:05

Draw 11
Sunday, 6 February, 14:05

Draw 12
Sunday, 6 February, 20:05

Figure skating

Australia earned one quota in Men's Singles and Women's Singles at the final Olympic Qualification Event, the 2021 Nebelhorn Trophy.

Freestyle skiing

Aerials

Freeski

Moguls
Men

Women

Ski Cross

Qualification legend: Q - Qualify to next round; FA - Qualify to medal final; FB - Qualify to consolation final

Luge

Based on the results during the 2021–22 Luge World Cup season, Australia qualified 1 sled in the men's singles.

Short track speed skating

Australia has qualified one male short track speed skater. Brendan Corey was named to the team in January 2022.

Skeleton

Snowboarding

Freestyle

Snowboard Cross

Qualification legend: Q - Qualify to next round; FA - Qualify to medal final

See also
Australia at the 2022 Winter Paralympics

References

Nations at the 2022 Winter Olympics
2022
Winter Olympics